Ilybiosoma is a genus of beetles in the family Dytiscidae, containing the following species:

 Ilybiosoma amaroides (Sharp, 1882)
 Ilybiosoma bjorkmanae (Hatch, 1939)
 Ilybiosoma brevicolle (LeConte, 1857)
 Ilybiosoma cordatum (LeConte, 1853)
 Ilybiosoma discicolle (Ancey, 1882)
 Ilybiosoma flohrianum (Sharp, 1887)
 Ilybiosoma ilybiiforme (Zimmermann, 1928)
 Ilybiosoma kermanense (J.Balfour-Browne, 1939)
 Ilybiosoma lugens (LeConte, 1852)
 Ilybiosoma minnesotense (Wallis, 1933)
 Ilybiosoma oaxacaense (Larson, 2000)
 Ilybiosoma pandurum (Leech, 1942)
 Ilybiosoma perplexum (Sharp, 1882)
 Ilybiosoma regulare (LeConte, 1852)
 Ilybiosoma roguum (Larson, 1997)
 Ilybiosoma seriatum (Say, 1823)
 Ilybiosoma yeti Brancucci & Hendrich, 2006

References

Dytiscidae